Hyaleucerea lemoulti is a moth of the subfamily Arctiinae. It was described by Schaus in 1905. It is found in Ecuador and French Guiana.

Larvae have been reared on Siparuna species.

References

Euchromiina
Moths described in 1905